Colin Murray Archer (born 7 December 1966) is an English musician and singer, best known as a member of the English rock bands Oasis, Beady Eye and Noel Gallagher's High Flying Birds, making him, alongside Chris Sharrock, one of the only members of Oasis to have been part of both Liam and Noel Gallagher's post-Oasis projects. He is also known for his work with Heavy Stereo. He joined Oasis as rhythm guitarist in November 1999, and handled lead guitar for acoustic songs as well. He also contributed to the writing of some of the band's songs. Oasis broke up in August 2009, but in November 2009, Liam Gallagher announced he was writing new material with Archer as well as other ex-Oasis members excluding his brother Noel, under the name Beady Eye. After two albums with Beady Eye, 2011's Different Gear, Still Speeding and 2013's BE, the band officially disbanded in October 2014. In 2017, Archer joined Noel Gallagher's High Flying Birds as lead guitarist, thus reuniting with former Oasis member Noel Gallagher.

The Edge and The Contenders 
Archer began his musical career in a group called The Edge in the early 1980s. They released two singles, "Take a Walk" and "Little Girl Blue". In early 1987, he was part of a band called The Contenders. He then formed Whirlpool in 1991 and signed to Food Records and EMI Publishing. Simon Scott was also involved on a live basis playing keyboards and back-up vocals. After gigging around the UK and recording for 18 months the group folded. This laid the foundations for Heavy Stereo, with Gem taking over the role of singer.

Heavy Stereo 
Archer formed Heavy Stereo with bassist Nez and guitarist Pete Downing both previously of Redcar indie band 2 Lost Sons who were subsequently signed with Creation Records. The band's only album, 1996's Déjà Voodoo, did not enjoy much critical or commercial success. However, Heavy Stereo's next release did receive more attention through demos of new material, a critically acclaimed contribution to The Jam tribute album, Fire and Skill: The Songs of the Jam, and opening on a Paul Weller tour.

Oasis 
Whilst at home in Durham, having returned to care for his mother, Archer – lying in front of the fire – heard a report on The Big Breakfast that Bonehead had left Oasis after a massive row with Noel Gallagher. He claims "I thought, Shit! They'll split now. I was a real fan, and I'm not just saying that. For me, Oasis had breathed life back into rock 'n' roll." He was unaware that Noel Gallagher – who knew Archer from both their days on the Creation Records label – had rung his home in London where it was Archer's son Joel's birthday party. Once Archer's mother had recovered, Gallagher invited him to Olympic Studios, where Oasis were mixing Standing on the Shoulder of Giants. "We went to the pub and I couldn't stand not knowing if I was a part of the band. After less than half a pint of Guinness I said, 'What does Liam say?' And Noel said, 'It's my f*cking band. I'll have who I want.'" Archer claims the rest of Heavy Stereo were pleased for him to join Oasis.

Since Archer did not perform on the Giants album, he received no royalties and, for the first few performances, was paid a standard session wage, about £85 a gig, as the new Oasis rhythm guitarist. His first official duty was to appear on the "Go Let It Out" video – on which he played lead guitar, as Andy Bell had yet to take over bass, so Noel played bass with Liam on acoustic guitar and vocals. Archer played his first rhythm guitar set at a session for alternative radio in Philadelphia.

Though Archer was officially referred to as Oasis' rhythm guitarist, his role in Oasis was much more than that. In live settings, he and Noel often switched between lead and rhythm guitar and both Noel and Liam Gallagher have praised Archer for his contributions in the studio. Archer also had a role as a songwriter. His first songwriting contribution after joining Oasis was "Hung in a Bad Place", which appeared on Oasis' fifth album Heathen Chemistry. This song was picked up for use in a commercial for Victoria's Secret in the US. His role was expanded on Oasis' sixth studio album, Don't Believe the Truth, which features Archer's "A Bell Will Ring" and "Love Like a Bomb", the latter of which he co-wrote with singer Liam Gallagher. He also contributed the B-sides "Eyeball Tickler" and "The Quiet Ones" – an acoustic song. He also wrote "To Be Where There's Life" on the 2008 album Dig Out Your Soul. Archer has said that he found it quite daunting to submit songs for consideration to the band because of Noel Gallagher's stature as a songwriter, whom he cites as one of his favourite songwriters. Archer, in rare occasions, contributed backing vocals to Oasis songs, such as on "The Meaning of Soul", "Force of Nature", and on the band's cover of The Who's "My Generation", played piano on "Stop Crying Your Heart Out" and harmonica on "Mucky Fingers".

Andy Bell highlighted Archer's significance to Oasis, saying "Oasis has completely evolved. Noel's old mates have left, he's been divorced and really changed his own life around. He still has Liam but his relationship with Liam is different – it's more tempestuous. He needs a less extreme mate and Gem's it. Gem chills Noel out. And that makes Oasis a more stable ship."

Although Noel Gallagher departed Oasis, Archer and he remained friends, and teamed up for a charity concert at the Royal Albert Hall.

Beady Eye 
Noel Gallagher quit Oasis in August 2009, following an argument with his brother in Paris. Gallagher placed part of the blame for his decision to leave on Archer, and Andy Bell, for a lack of support saying "the lack of support and understanding from my... band mates has left me with no other option than to get me cape and seek pastures new." Soon afterwards the band announced they had split. However, Archer, Bell, Liam Gallagher and Oasis live drummer Chris Sharrock resolved to work together on a new project under a new name, Beady Eye. While Noel Gallagher maintains a friendship with Archer, as well as Oasis drummer Chris Sharrock, he claims that he has not spoken with his brother Liam or former Oasis bassist Andy Bell.

Archer contributed guitar, bass and backing vocals to Beady Eye's debut album Different Gear, Still Speeding, released on 28 February 2011.

Archer also contributed guitar, keyboards, and backing vocals on Beady Eye's second album BE, released on 10 June 2013.

On 25 October 2014, Liam Gallagher announced, via Twitter, that Beady Eye had disbanded.

Noel Gallagher's High Flying Birds 
In December 2015, Archer appeared with Noel Gallagher at an acoustic gig in Lincoln on 6 December 2015, followed by an appearance for BBC Radio 2 the following night.

In October 2016, Gem joined Noel Gallagher's High Flying Birds for their performance of "Half the World Away" dedicated to Caroline Aherne for Channel 4's Stand Up to Cancer telethon; leading to speculation he had become a permanent member of the band.

In July 2017, it was confirmed that Gem had become a permanent member of Noel Gallagher's High Flying Birds.

Other work 
Outside of Oasis, Archer has collaborated with a few other artists, most notably Paul Weller. He has contributed acoustic guitar to the song 'One x One' on Weller's 2002 album Illumination and guitars and mellotron to the song 'Echoes Round The Sun on Weller's 2008 album 22 Dreams. He participated in an acoustic tour of the US with Weller when Steve Cradock of Ocean Colour Scene was unavailable, and provided guitar and backing vocals at the 2010 NME Awards when Weller performed a live set having received the 'Godlike Genius Award'.

He also contributed guitar to David Holmes' 1997 album Let's Get Killed.

He also assisted Noel Gallagher in producing the first Proud Mary album, a band signed to Gallagher's Sour Mash record label.

According to album notes, Gem also worked with his good friend and previous Oasis and Beady Eye colleague Andy Bell on his debut solo Album (not under the “Glok” alias) called “The View from Halfway Down”, contributing some drums, bass and guitar tracks, and also providing some of the recording work.

Personal life
On 1 August 2013, Archer was admitted to hospital with serious head trauma and a fractured skull after a freak accident at home, by falling down a flight of stairs. After several scans, to ensure that there was no long-term effects, Beady Eye's V-Festival act was cancelled, so that he could be kept under observation. He was later said to be in a stable condition.

He was married to Lou and is father to Joel and Libby. On November 26, 2022 he married Christine Mary Biller during a ceremony in London, England.

References

1966 births
Living people
English rock guitarists
Oasis (band) members
Beady Eye members
Britpop musicians
Rhythm guitarists
Noel Gallagher's High Flying Birds members